Route 12 is a national route of Uruguay. In 1983, it was assigned the name Doctor Luis Alberto de Herrera. It connects Florida to Minas.

References

Roads in Uruguay